Bottle Rocket is one of the albums from Christian rock band Guardian. The album was released on August 5, 1997 and was produced by Steve Taylor.

This album delved deeper into the alternative and grunge genre the band explored in their previous album.

Track listing
 "Are We Feeling Comfortable Yet?" (Rowe, Taylor) - 3:15
 "Bottle Rocket" (Bach, Palacios, Rowe, Taylor) - 3:43
 "Coffee Can" (Palacios, Taylor) - 3:44
 "Revelation" (Bach, Rowe) - 3:46
 "What Does It Take?" (Rowe, Taylor) - 4:09
 "Babble On" (Palacios, Rowe, Taylor) - 4:26
 "Blue Light Special" (Bach, Palacios, Taylor) - 2:43
 "Break Me Down" (Palacios) - 3:40
 "The Water Is Fine" (Palacios, Taylor) - 2:45
 "My Queen Esther" (Palacios) - 3:47
 "Hell to Pay" (Palacios, Taylor) - 3:22
 "Fear the Auctioneer" (Palacios, Taylor) - 2:56
 "Harder Than It Seems" (Rowe, Taylor) - 4:15
 "Salvation" (Bach, Palacios, Rowe) - 3:58

Song Meanings
 "Coffee Can" was written by guitarist Tony Palacios and was inspired by a recurring dream his mother had shortly before she died of cancer. In the dream she was trying to fly to heaven on a coffee can, but couldn't get it more than a foot or two off the ground. "The dream image became a metaphor for the futility of trusting in one's own strength, and consequently a metaphor of the deep need for grace".
 "My Queen Esther" and "What Does It Take" deal with the easing of burdens at the foot of the cross for "those who labor and are heavy laden."
 The title cut, "Bottle Rocket," (a 90's version of "This Little Light of Mine") is an encouragement to live out your faith in view of the world.

Personnel 
Guardian
 Jamie Rowe – vocals
 Tony Palacios – guitars, vocals
 David Bach – bass, vocals
 Karl Ney – drums

Guest musicians
 John Mark Painter – theremin (2), strings (2), Mellotron (2, 10, 11), keyboards (12)
 Eric Darken – percussion
 Russ Long – tambourine (6)
 Shane Boyd – poetic recitation (7)

Production 
 Steve Taylor – producer
 Jim Chaffee – executive producer, A&R direction 
 Russ Long – engineer, mixing 
 Steve Bishir – additional engineer 
 Wade Jaynes – additional engineer 
 David Schober – additional engineer
 Chris Grainger – recording assistant, mix assistant (5, 9, 14)
 Rich Hanson – recording assistant 
 Dave Latto – recording assistant 
 Amanda Sears – recording assistant 
 Jason Van Pelt – recording assistant
 Kenton Kelsey – mix assistant (1-4, 6-8, 10-12)
 Bob Ludwig – mastering 
 Buddy Jackson – art direction
 Christine Knubel – design 
 Matthew Barnes – photography 
 Lord & Michaels Inc. – management 

Studios
 Recorded at Quad Studios and The Carport (Nashville, Tennessee).
 Mixed at Sound Kitchen (Franklin, Tennessee) and The Carport.
 Mastered at Gateway Mastering (Portland, Maine).

References 

Guardian (band) albums
1997 albums